Macromorphus boisduvali is a species of beetle in the family Carabidae, the only species in the genus Macromorphus.

References

Scaritinae